Barzillai Gannett (June 17, 1764 – 1832) was a U.S. Representative from Massachusetts.

Born in Bridgewater in the Province of Massachusetts Bay, Gannett was graduated from Harvard University in 1785.  He studied theology, but did not enter the ministry.  He served as Selectman of Pittston, Maine (then a district of Massachusetts).  He also served as town clerk in 1794 and town moderator 1797–1802.   Gannett was Selectman and assessor of Gardiner, Maine from 1803 to 1808.  He was appointed as the first postmaster of Gardiner and served from September 30, 1804, to October 1, 1809.  He also served as Town Moderator. Gannett served as member of both the Massachusetts House of Representatives and the Massachusetts State Senate.

Gannett was elected as a Democratic-Republican to the Eleventh and Twelfth Congresses and served from March 4, 1809, until his resignation in 1812.

Because of an accusation regarding a breach of trust Gannett left Maine, changed his name to Benjamin Gardiner, and moved to Ohio.

During about the year 1822 Barzillai Gannett (Benjamin Gardiner) again suddenly disappeared from Ohio.

Gannett died in New York City in 1832.

Notes

References

1764 births
1832 deaths
Members of the Massachusetts House of Representatives
Massachusetts state senators
Harvard University alumni
People from Bridgewater, Massachusetts
Massachusetts Democratic-Republicans
People from Gardiner, Maine
Democratic-Republican Party members of the United States House of Representatives from the District of Maine
People from Pittston, Maine
Members of the United States House of Representatives from Massachusetts